Bring Up the Bodies is an historical novel by Hilary Mantel; sequel to the award-winning Wolf Hall; and part of a trilogy charting the rise and fall of Thomas Cromwell, the powerful minister in the court of King Henry VIII. It won the 2012 Booker Prize and the 2012 Costa Book of the Year. The final novel in the trilogy, The Mirror and the Light, was published in March 2020.

Plot
Bring Up the Bodies follows closely upon the events of Wolf Hall. The King and Cromwell—now Master Secretary to the King's Privy Council—are guests of the Seymour family at Wolf Hall. Cromwell himself is attracted to the Seymours' daughter Jane.

The King spends time with Jane Seymour and begins to fall in love; his marriage to the new queen, Anne Boleyn, is sometimes loving but often descends into angry quarrels. "I cannot live as I have lived," Henry finally tells Cromwell in private. He has tired of Anne, who brings him neither peace nor a son, and wants his marriage ended.  Cromwell vows to make this happen.

Ever the dealmaker, Cromwell tries to negotiate a separation through Anne's father, Wiltshire, and her brother, Rochford. Wiltshire is willing to negotiate; Rochford is not, and tells Cromwell that if Anne's marriage to the King endures he will "make short work of you."

Cromwell talks to those close to Anne.  The more he does, the more he hears she's been unfaithful to the King. The musician, Mark Smeaton, and Anne's sister-in-law, Lady Rochford, pass on rumours to this effect. Cromwell begins to build his case. With proof enough to have her tried for treason, the King is willing to see Anne destroyed to serve his ends. Mindful that many of those closest to Anne helped ruin his mentor, Cardinal Wolsey, Cromwell relishes the opportunity to bring them down.  And though he is not sure all of the evidence is true, he has gone so far in the matter that he cannot turn back.

In the end, Anne and several of her circle, including her brother, are tried and put to death. The King moves to wed Jane Seymour and rewards Cromwell with a barony. Having engineered the King's new marriage, and with the new Queen's family as his firm allies, his position as Henry's chief adviser is now assured.

Publication
Bring Up the Bodies was published in May 2012, by HarperCollins in the United Kingdom and by Henry Holt and Co. in the United States, to critical acclaim.

Reception
Janet Maslin reviewed the novel positively in The New York Times:

Adaptations
In January 2014, the Royal Shakespeare Company (RSC) staged a two-part adaptation of both Wolf Hall and Bring Up the Bodies in its winter season, with a script by Mantel and Mike Poulton. Premiering at the Swan Theatre, Stratford-upon-Avon, it transferred to the Aldwych Theatre, London, later that year.

A six-part BBC television series Wolf Hall, the adaptation of the books Wolf Hall and Bring Up the Bodies, starring Mark Rylance, Damian Lewis and Jonathan Pryce, was broadcast in the UK in January 2015 and the United States in April 2015.

Awards and honours
2012 Booker Prize, winner
2012 Specsavers National Book Awards "UK Author of the Year"
2012 Costa Book Awards (Novel), winner
2012 Costa Book Awards (Book of the Year), winner
2012 Salon What To Read Awards
2013 Walter Scott Prize for Historical Fiction, shortlist

References

External links
 Hilary Mantel's official website
 Hilary Mantel's Facebook fan page
 .

Fiction set in the 1530s
2012 British novels
Booker Prize-winning works
British historical novels
Costa Book Award-winning works
Cultural depictions of Anne Boleyn
Cultural depictions of Henry VIII
Fourth Estate books
Henry Holt and Company books
Novels about royalty
Novels by Hilary Mantel
Novels set in Tudor England
Jane Seymour